A portmanteau is a word or morpheme whose form and meaning are derived from a blending of two or more distinct forms, e.g., smog from smoke and fog.

Portmanteau may also refer to:

 Portmanteau (luggage), a case or bag to carry clothes in that usually opens into two equally sized compartments
 Portmanteau (mail), a specialized mail bag
 Portmanteau film, an anthology film made up of several short films that interrelate
 Portmanteau inhibitor, in pharmaceuticals, a drug which molecularly combines the active portions of two inhibitor-class drugs
 Portmanteau sentence, in linguistics, a particular type of code-switching
 Portmanteau test, in statistics, a test applied to autocorrelations of a time series
 Portmanteau theorem on convergence of measures in probability theory
 A coat rack, from the French porter (carry) and manteau (cloak)

See also 
 Border towns in the United States with portmanteau names
 List of portmanteaus
 Portamento, in music, a continuous change in pitch (unrelated)

nl:Portmanteau